Joseph Rose (born May 6, 1969, in Wenatchee, Washington, United States) is an American journalist, priest and theologian formerly based in Portland, Oregon. He currently lives in West Hartford, Connecticut, where he is assistant rector of St. James's Episcopal Church. Rose was on the staff of The Oregonian as a writer, columnist and multimedia producer from 1999 until 2016. He has written about crime, prisons, government, Portland's world-famous bicycle scene, religion, popular culture, music, film, Oregon's methamphetamine epidemic and transportation. He is also a former freelance writer for Wired.com.  As of January 2017, he described himself as retired from The Oregonian in order to go into ministry.

In 2004, he wrote the newspaper's "Faces of Meth" story, which was turned into billboards and posters as well as replicated by other American media outlets, including PBS's Frontline. He has also written about the childhood and family of Portland-native Matt Groening, creator of The Simpsons.

Rose's articles on a Gulf War war veteran secretly living in the wilderness of Portland's Forest Park with his young daughter were the inspiration for the 2018 film "Leave No Trace."

In 2008, Rose became The Oregonians chief transportation writer, with a daily blog and weekly Metro column called "Hard Drive".

He is a graduate of Central Washington University in Ellensburg, Washington. Rose graduated from Yale University with a Master of Divinity before being ordained.

When he was living in Oregon, Rose was also a leader of the "alternative liturgy" worship movement in the U.S. Episcopal Church.  The movement creates worship services based on the music of popular contemporary musicians such as U2, Radiohead, Woody Guthrie and Bruce Springsteen. A March 2012 story in Willamette Week called Rose "the King of Hymns". In the article, Rose describes the spirit of the events: "We get a lot of folks who come but really aren’t connected to a church. They’re part of the very secular Oregon. But they feel a spiritual connection to popular music."

Rose's journalism awards include one for breaking news in the 2011 C.B. Blethen Awards and one of the 2013 National Headliner Awards in the category of special or feature column.

References

Journalists from Oregon
The Oregonian people
Central Washington University alumni
1969 births
People from Cornwall, Connecticut
People from Wenatchee, Washington
Living people